Renaissance Party may refer to:
 Renaissance (French political party)
 Renaissance (Italian political party)
 Renaissance (Monegasque political party)
 Renaissance Party (Egypt), an Egyptian Islamist political party
 Egypt Renaissance Party, an Egyptian political party
 Egyptian Renaissance Party, an Egyptian Sufi political party
 Ennahda or Renaissance Party, a Tunisian political party

See also
 Islamic Renaissance Movement, an Algerian political party